Trachycalyptus is an extinct genus of glyptodont. It lived during the Early Pliocene, and its fossilized remains were discovered in South America.

Description

Like all glyptodonts, Trachycalyptus had a heavy body protected by a sturdy armor composed of osteoderms fused together. It had wrinkled and strongly punctuated osteoderms ; the central figure was mainly distinguished by a lower density of small holes on its surface. The absence of radial groove allows to distinguish it from other genera of glyptodonts. The tail was protected by a caudal tube, characterized by the presence of wrinkled osteoderms with numerous vascular perforations, without differentiation of the peripheral area. There were three pairs of large lateral osteoderms on the tail.

Classification

The genus Trachycalyptus was first described in 1908 by Florentino Ameghino, based on fossil remains found in Pliocene terrains of Argentina. The type species is Trachycalyptus chapadmalensis. A Late Miocene species, Trachycalyptus cingulatus, initially ascribed by Florentino Ameghino to another genus, was later tentatively attributed to this genus, although this attribution is still contested. It was similar to Trachycalyptoides, from the Late Miocene of Bolivia.

Trachycalyptus was a member of the glyptodont Sclerocalyptini ; it was originally considered closely related to the genus Urotherium; however, it was recently placed closer to the genera Lomaphorus and Neosclerocalyptus.

Bibliography
Cruz, L. E. and Fernicola, J. C. 2010. Las especies del género Trachycalyptus Ameghino (Glyptodontia): consideraciones taxonómicas. Jornadas Argentinas de Paleontología de Vertebrados; 2010.

Prehistoric cingulates
Prehistoric placental genera
Pliocene xenarthrans
Pliocene mammals of South America
Pliocene genus extinctions
Neogene Argentina
Fossils of Argentina
Fossil taxa described in 1908
Taxa named by Florentino Ameghino